Star Search 2010 is the 10th installment of Star Search. Auditions were held across Singapore, Malaysia, China and Taiwan.

The competition began on 30 August 2010. The Semifinal took place on 14 November and Grand Final took place on 5 December 2010. Between the Semifinal and Grand Final, the remaining contestants were put through intensive training.

Selection process

Auditions

Finalists
The final 20 finalists were confirmed as follows;

Key:
 – Winner
 – Runner-up
 – Third place

Results summary
Colour key

Quarter-finals

Grand Finals (5 December 2010)
The Grand Finals was hosted by Guo Liang, Quan Yi Fong and Dasmond Koh. Former contestants and winners from the 9 previous editions still with MediaCorp were present as well.

The judges were Hong Kong director and actor Lawrence Cheng, veteran Hong Kong actor Ha Yu, former Star Search winner Zoe Tay, MediaCorp deputy CEO Chang Long Jong, current MediaCorp actress Fann Wong and veteran MediaCorp producer Kwek Leng Soong.

Competition
Q & A Segment
Host: Chew Chor Meng, Dasmond Koh
Guest artistes: Black Rose cast - Guo Liang, Quan Yi Fong, Michelle Chong, Lee Teng, Dennis Chew

Acting Segment
Dramas used and guest artistes: Daddy at Home (Chen Hanwei, Ann Kok, Cynthia Koh), The Little Nyonya (Lin Meijiao, Ng Hui, Yao Wenlong), Together (Zheng Geping, Constance Song, Zhang Zhenhuan, Zhou Ying)

References

External links
Star Search 2010 on xin.msn.com

2010 Singaporean television seasons